Taumata is a New Zealand Māori surname that may refer to
Arana Taumata (born 1989), rugby league footballer
Kevin Taumata, Māori New Zealander Australian film and television actor 
Piripi Taumata-a-Kura (fl. 1823–1868), New Zealand Māori evangelist

See also
Taumatawhakatangihangakoauauotamateaturipukakapikimaungahoronukupokaiwhenuakitanatahu, a hill in New Zealand

Māori-language surnames